The Making of the English Landscape is a 1954 book by the English local historian William George Hoskins. The book is also the introductory volume in a series of the same name which deals with the English Landscape county by county.

It is illustrated with 82 monochrome plates, mostly photographs by Hoskins himself, and 17 maps or plans. It has appeared in at least 35 editions and reprints in English and other languages.

The book is a landscape history of England and a seminal text in that discipline and in local history. The brief history of some one thousand years is widely used in local and environmental history courses.

Hoskins defines the theme of the book in the first chapter, arguing that a landscape historian needs to use botany, physical geography and natural history as well as historical knowledge to interpret any given scene fully. The remaining chapters describe how the English landscape was formed from the Anglo-Saxon period onwards, starting c. 450 AD, and looking in detail at the mediaeval landscape, the depopulation following the Black Death, the Tudor period through to the splendour of the Georgian period, the parliamentary enclosures that affected much of the English midlands, the industrial revolution, the development of road, canal, and railway transport networks, and finally the growth of towns from Norman times onwards. There is little mention of cities. The concluding chapter, however, laments the damage done to the English countryside by "the villainous requirements of the new age" such as military airfields and arterial roads, describes the new England as barbaric, and invites the reader to contemplate the past.

The work has been widely admired, but also described as grandly emotive, populist, and openly anti-modernist. Writers have praised the book for helping them understand and interpret the landscape in which they lived.

Book

Overview

The introduction sets out Hoskins' stall with "No book exists to describe the manner in which the various landscapes of this country came to assume the shape and appearance they now have", mentioning geology ("only one aspect of the subject"), the clearing of woodlands, the reclaiming of moor and marsh, the creation of fields, roads, towns, country houses, mines, canals and railways: "in short, with everything that has altered the natural landscape."

Editions and translations

The first edition was published by Hodder and Stoughton in 1954. They reprinted the book in 1956, 1957, 1960, 1963, 1965, 1967, 1969, 1970, 1971, 1974, 1977. They issued a new edition in 1988, a revised edition in 1992,  and a new edition in 2005, reissued in 2006. They published Korean and Japanese editions in 2008.

In 1970, Penguin Books published a paperback Pelican edition in England and a Penguin edition in the United States. Penguin reprinted in 1973, 1974, 1975, 1977, 1978, 1979, 1981, 1983, 1985, 1986, 1988, 1991,  and 2005.

In 1977, Book Club Associates published an edition in England.

In 1988, Coronet Books and Guild Publishers published editions in England.

In 1992, Teach Yourself Books published a paperback edition in England.

In 2005, the Folio Society published an edition in England.

In 2013, Little Toller books published a paperback edition in England.

Illustrations

The book is illustrated with 82 monochrome plates and 17 maps or plans, all uncredited except for some use of Ordnance Survey maps, and so apparently the work of Hoskins himself. These are closely integrated into the text; for example, the text in chapter 1 is accompanied by a pair of diagrams showing how a holloway ('hollow way') could be formed by the digging of a 'double ditch', i.e. a pair of raised earth banks either side of a ditch to mark the boundary of two estates, and supported by a photograph (Plate 13) of a sunken lane in Devon, explained by Hoskins as a boundary, from probably the seventh century, between the Saxon estates of (royal) Silverton and Exeter Abbey. The photograph shows high hedgebanks in bright sunshine, dwarfing the figure of a woman in the middle distance.

Contents

The book covers its subject in 10 chapters:

1. The Landscape before the English Settlement

Hoskins uses the first few pages of this chapter as an introduction, beginning with praise for William Wordsworth's A Guide through the District of the Lakes (1810), and from which he quotes a passage in which the reader is asked to envisage "an image of the tides visiting and revisiting the friths, the main sea dashing against the bolder shore". Hoskins writes that on a desolate moor one can feel oneself imaginatively back in time to the Bronze Age, but that there are now few such unaltered places left. He argues that the landscape historian "needs to be a botanist, a physical geographer, and a naturalist, as well as an historian" to understand a scene in full:

The rest of the chapter covers Pre-Roman, Western (i.e. Celtic) and Roman Britain. He estimates very roughly that 750,000 acres at most were in use as arable or grassland in Roman times, compared to 27 million acres in 1914.

2. The English Settlement

Hoskins describes how England was settled with Anglo-Saxon people between c. 450 and 1066 AD, making the country a land of villages. Estate boundaries from this period survive in features such as sunken lanes and banks. The Scandinavian conquest of much of England from the late 9th century added more villages, though many with Scandinavian placename elements such as -by ('village') may simply have been renamed Saxon settlements.

Many English villages were given their shape in this period, and almost all are described in some detail in the eleventh century Domesday Book. Hoskins identifies three major types of village: those around a green or central square, as at Finchingfield in Essex; those along a single street, like Henley in Arden in Warwickshire; and those consisting of apparently haphazardly scattered dwellings, like Middle Barton near Hoskins's home in Oxfordshire.

3. The Colonization of Mediaeval England

This chapter looks at the mediaeval landscape from the Domesday Book onwards, with the section 'The Landscape in 1086'. The country had almost every village that exists today; a typical one, Hoskins writes, had a small watermill and a church without a spire.

In 'The Clearing of the Woodlands', Hoskins argues that before the 15th century England must have looked like one great forest, but most of the woods were cleared for arable or pasture in the 12th and 13th centuries. Under Henry II perhaps a third of the country was royal forest.

Hoskins begins the section on 'Marsh, Fen, and Moor' with the words "There are certain sheets of the one-inch Ordnance Survey maps which one can sit down and read like a book for an hour on end, with growing pleasure and imaginative excitement". One such section is of The Wash, rich in mediaeval detail. Marshes such as those in Lincolnshire, Norfolk and the Pevensey Levels were reclaimed at this time, whole communities working together, often under the Danelaw.

'Buildings in the landscape' briefly describes abbeys, churches, mills, bridges and castles built to serve the growing population, which just before the Black Death had tripled since Domesday.

4. The Black Death and after

Hoskins describes the abandonment of villages from the bubonic plague of 1348, the Black Death, which killed a third to a half of the population (he states), and the subsequent new colonisation and building as the population eventually recovered. Marginal land such as the Breckland of Norfolk and Suffolk, never thickly populated, was abandoned. Many villages in counties such as Leicestershire were deserted. Villages such as Lower Ditchford in Gloucestershire can be seen today only as a ground-plan from the air.

Between 1350 and 1500, many new buildings appeared, especially churches with towers like Fotheringhay in Northamptonshire. Some fine bridges as at Wadebridge in Cornwall are from this period.

5. Tudor to Georgian England

Hoskins starts this chapter by observing that in 1500 in Tudor times there were roughly three sheep for every human being in England, perhaps 8 million sheep to two and a half million people. There were four million acres of hardwood forest, remembered now as Epping Forest, the Forest of Arden, Sherwood Forest, the Forest of Dean, Wychwood and many others. A village might be surrounded by a single enormous thousand acre field, shared amongst all the village's farmers. There were extensive heaths and wild places, largely uninhabited, with "no industrial smoke, nothing faster on the roads than a horse, no incessant noises from the sky". The first enclosures and the flowering of rural England, country houses and parks such as the magnificent Burghley House and Knole date from this period up to Georgian times.

6. Parliamentary Enclosure and the Landscape

In this chapter Hoskins describes the effects of enclosure on the landscape and on fields, hedgerows and trees, roads and farmhouses. He begins by quoting the rural poet John Clare: "Inclosure, thou'rt a curse upon the land, and tasteless was the wretch who thy existence plann'd".

Parliamentary enclosures accounted for about 4.5 million acres of what had been open fields, not counting the enclosure of common land and wild 'waste'. In 1700 roughly half England's arable land was already enclosed; by the end of the enclosure process, almost all of it was. The revolution in the landscape began in about 1750, affecting about 3,000 parishes, especially in the English midlands. Between 1760 and 1800 there were 1,479 enclosure acts, covering 2.5 million acres; another 1.5 million acres were enclosed by 1844, by more than a thousand further acts. Some counties such as Kent, Essex and Devon were little affected, having largely been enclosed much earlier, often directly from forest or moorland. Many miles of new straight hedgerows were laid to mark out the newly enclosed fields of the midlands; in some areas such as Derbyshire, straight limestone walls were used instead. Many straight new roads were created at the same time. Farmhouses remained in the old villages at first, but new red-brick Victorian ones were often built in the middle of their now enclosed land in due course.

7. The Industrial Revolution and the Landscape

Hoskins begins his chapter on industrialisation with the remark "England was still a peaceful agricultural country at the beginning of the seventeenth century." He describes the early industrial landscape, water power and early mills, steam power and slums. He names transformative inventions such as Kay's flying shuttle of 1733 and Hargreaves's spinning jenny of 1767, and comments that Matthew Boulton opened his steam engine factory "in the still unravished country" outside Birmingham in 1765. He quotes a poem by Anna Seward lamenting the ravishing of Coalbrookdale, c. 1785, and one by Wordsworth from The Excursion. He is critical of the industrial slums and the smoke and dirt of the Staffordshire Potteries. He emphasises the rapid growth of industrial towns like Preston, and of new towns like Middlesbrough, which went from a single farm in 1830 to over 50,000 inhabitants in 1880. However he appreciates the mining landscapes of Cornwall, including the gleaming white china clay pits of St Austell and the abandoned tin mines of St Cleer, commenting that "there is a point, as Arthur Young saw, when industrial ugliness becomes sublime".

8. Roads, Canals, and Railways

Hoskins describes roads and trackways from the Iron Age (like the Jurassic Way across the midlands, near his Oxfordshire home) and Roman times (like Akeman Street in the same area). He notes that the Fosse Way runs for miles in Gloucestershire away from any village, as the Anglo-Saxons built villages away from large roads for safety. Still in his home area, he records that "the wide green track now called Dornford Lane" was built in the 10th century for supplies to be carted from the Anglo-Saxon kings' own estate at Barton. He goes on to describe the building of the canal network between roughly 1760 and 1825, noting that just one town was created by the canals, Stourport. Soon afterwards, a much more widespread transport network transformed the English landscape: the railways. Hoskins devotes over a page to each of two quotations from Charles Dickens's Dombey and Son, describing the construction in 1836 of a railway in Camden Town. He mentions, too, that Wordsworth campaigned against the railway from Kendal to Windermere, bringing trains into the heart of the Lake District, and that conservatives like Wordsworth "lost all along the line".

9. The Landscape of Towns

The last chapter of the body of the book – if Chapter 10 is considered more or less an epilogue – covers towns seen as part of the English landscape. Hoskins justifies this on the grounds that understanding towns brings pleasure. He describes in turn planned towns, the open-field town, and the market town. Towns were planned as early as Norman times, Abbot Baldwin planning Bury St Edmunds between 1066 and 1086; Stratford-on-Avon was laid out in 1196. Another burst of town planning came with the spa towns in the late 18th century, and of new industrial towns like Middlesbrough and Barrow-in-Furness in the mid 19th century. Open-field towns like Nottingham, Leicester, and Stamford grew naturally in their own open fields, but were trapped by pasture rights from growing in the 19th century, giving Nottingham slums, and Leicester a problem that it just managed to solve, growing across its fields: while Stamford stopped growing entirely, becoming fossilised as what Hoskins calls a museum piece of a beautiful 17th and 18th century town. Finally, the market towns like Marlborough grew up around their often large and handsome market places, which are however of any number of shapes.

10. The Landscape Today
Hoskins concludes with a brief chapter, with one image, Plate 82, "The completed English landscape" showing a tall tree in a wide open field, a strip of hedges and villages just visible in the distance. The chapter laments the damage caused to parts of the English landscape, mentioning bulldozers and tractors, nuclear bombers and by-passes, and ends by celebrating again the wealth of detail within a few hundred yards of Hoskins' study window at Steeple Barton in Oxfordshire.

Reception

Contemporary

The geographer E. G. R. Taylor, reviewing the book for the Royal Geographical Society in 1955, wrote that Hoskins made the case for getting a strong pair of boots to learn landscape history clearly enough. Taylor compared the book to Dudley Stamp's Man and the Land, published a few months earlier in 1955, saying that Hoskins seemed to have missed it, but that given the differences in their approaches, they could be read side by side. She noted also that Hoskins did not talk about London though he covered town landscapes, and appeared unaware of urban geography. Her review ended by remarking that Hoskins "views the industrial revolution with mounting horror, and the industrialists themselves are bitterly chastised as 'completely and grotesquely insensitive. No scruples weakened their lust for money; they made their money and left their muck.'" She noted however that Hoskins had happily moved to "a quiet spot in Oxfordshire where he can forget the 'barbaric England of the scientists, the military men and the politicians' and look out of his study window on to the past", where, she wrote, he "draws for us a last tender and evocative picture of the 'gentle unravished English landscape.'" Dr. Hoskins, she wrote, forgetting all the horrors, "reaches back through the centuries one by one and rediscovers Eden".

Modern

Penelope Lively, writing in The Guardian, describes the book as

William Boyd, also in The Guardian, described the book as "an absolute trailblazer, a revolution." He notes that W. H. Auden "revered" the book, and that reading Hoskins had enabled him to 'read' a landscape as a "historical palimpsest":

Local historian Graeme White, in The Medieval English Landscape, 1400–1540, calls Hoskins' book "brilliantly-crafted" and observes that "Although this famously railed against the 'England of the arterial by-pass, treeless and stinking of diesel oil' – along with much else belonging to the mid-twentieth century – the fact that national car ownership more than doubled during the 1950s made this a subject whose time had come."

Paul Johnson, writing in The Spectator, said that the book "was for me an eye-opener, as it was for many people. It told us of the extent to which our landscape had been made by man, not God, and taught us to look much more observantly at it."

An assessment

Matthew H. Johnson, writing a chapter on English culture and landscape in the edited book The Public Value of the Humanities, identifies "six key points" established by Hoskins:

1. The landscape is of great antiquity ("everything is much older than we think")

2. Landscapes often changed suddenly, as in the 18th century enclosures.

3. Hoskins, following O. G. S. Crawford's 1953 Archaeology in the Field, stressed we had to read the landscape using research to reveal its cultural value.

4. Hoskins thus told a "grand and emotive story about that landscape." Johnson compares this to J.R.R. Tolkien's account in The Lord of the Rings when the hobbits return to a "despoiled and industrialized landscape of the Shire".

5. The narrative is populist, to be disseminated "to anyone who would listen." The result was that it became part of English post-war culture.

6. It was "openly anti-modernist". In evidence, Johnson cites Hoskins's "most famous passage" from the concluding chapter:

Television
In 1972 the BBC broadcast an episode of the television programme Horizon on The Making of the English Landscape produced by Peter Jones, and featuring Hoskins as presenter. Although the programme was inspired by the original book, Hoskins wrote an 84-page illustrated BBC book, English Landscapes, to accompany the programme. Later in the 1970s, Jones went on to produce a series of 12 TV programmes for BBC2, Landscapes of England, in which additional areas of the country were studied, leading to a further title, One Man's England to accompany the series.

See also
 Francis Pryor, author of The Making of the British Landscape

References

Further reading

1955 non-fiction books
Landscape history
History books about England
Archaeology books
English non-fiction books
Hodder & Stoughton books